Vicious is a fantasy novel by American author V. E. Schwab published by Tor Books in 2013, focused around two college students who learn how to create superhuman abilities and later become archenemies.

Plot summary
Victor and Eli begin as college roommates and discover that near-death experiences, under the right conditions, can create superhuman abilities. When Victor tries to create his abilities, things go wrong and people take a fall. Victor ends up getting put in jail. 10 years later, Eli has started a crusade to kill every other super-powered person and Victor has broken out of jail.

Reception 
The Guardian called Vicious "a brilliant exploration of the superhero mythos and a riveting revenge thriller". It received a starred review from Publishers Weekly, which called Schwab's characters "vital and real, never reduced to simple archetypes" and praised the book as "a rare superhero novel as epic and gripping as any classic comic". Publishers Weekly also named Vicious one of its best books of 2013 for SF/Fantasy/Horror. The American Library Association's Reference and User Services Association likewise awarded it the top fantasy book in their 2014 Reading List.

In late 2013 the rights for a film adaptation of Vicious were bought jointly by Story Mining & Supply Co and Ridley Scott's Scott Free Productions. In May 2014, Alexander Felix was hired to write the screenplay.

Sequel  
The sequel to Vicious, titled Vengeful, was released on September 25, 2018.

References

External links
 

2013 American novels
2013 fantasy novels
American fantasy novels
Fictional rivalries
Tor Books books